David Bawden is a British information science scholar. He is a professor in the department of Library and Information Science at City, University of London. He is editor of the Journal of Documentation and has written or coauthored several books.

Education and career
Bawden received a bachelor's degree in organic chemistry from the University of Liverpool and a master's degree and PhD in information science from the University of Sheffield. His doctoral thesis, completed in 1978, was titled Substructural analysis techniques for structure–property correlation within computerised chemical information systems. He worked in industry as an information scientist for Pfizer before taking a position at City, University of London in 1990. In 2002 he became editor of the Journal of Documentation.

Selected publications

Books

Chapters and articles

References 

21st-century scholars
Alumni of the University of Liverpool
Alumni of the University of Sheffield

Year of birth missing (living people)
Living people